Kendrick Osborn Jr. (born June 10, 1997) is an American football wide receiver for the Minnesota Vikings of the National Football League (NFL). He played college football at Buffalo and Miami.

College career
Osborn is a native of Ypsilanti, Michigan and attended Lincoln High School before transferring to IMG Academy for his senior year. Osborn played at Buffalo for three years. He had 96 catches for 1,490 yards and 12 touchdowns. Osborn earned second-team All-MAC honors in his last year at Buffalo. He transferred to Miami as a graduate transfer in 2019. He led the Hurricanes with 50 receptions for 547 yards and five touchdowns in addition to returning 16 punts for 255 yards (15.9 average) and 10 kickoffs for 201 yards (20.1 average).

Professional career

Minnesota Vikings
Osborn was selected by the Minnesota Vikings with the 176th pick in the fifth round of the 2020 NFL Draft.

2021 season
In Week 1, Osborn had 7 receptions for 76 receiving yards in a 27–24 OT loss to the  Cincinnati Bengals. In Week 2, Osborn had a breakout game, bringing in 5 catches for 91 yards and a touchdown in another narrow loss, this one against the Arizona Cardinals 34–33. In Week 6, Osborn caught the game-winning touchdown pass in overtime against the Carolina Panthers. In Week 14, Osborn had 3 receptions for 83 yards including a 63 yard touchdown pass from Kirk Cousins in a 36-28 win over the Pittsburgh Steelers.

Osborn finished the regular season with 655 receiving yards and seven touchdowns, both of which were third-most on the Vikings behind Justin Jefferson and Adam Thielen.

2022 season
During Week 15 against the Indianapolis Colts, Osborn finished with 157 receiving yards and a touchdown on 10 receptions. Trailing by 33 points, the Vikings came back and won 39-36 in overtime on December 17th, the largest comeback in NFL history

Personal Life
Osborn is a Christian. On March 6th, Osborn and three others helped save a man from a burning car in Austin.

References

1997 births
Living people
Players of American football from Michigan
Sportspeople from Ypsilanti, Michigan
American football wide receivers
American football return specialists
Buffalo Bulls football players
Miami Hurricanes football players
Minnesota Vikings players
IMG Academy alumni